Maine-de-Boixe is a commune in the Charente department in the administrative region of Nouvelle-Aquitaine, France.

Population

See also
Communes of the Charente department

References

Communes of Charente